Landport Drapery Bazaar was a department store located on Commercial Road, Portsmouth.

History
In 1870 Robert E Davies, the three time Mayor of Portsmouth opened a department store on what is now called Commercial Road (previously Union Road and Landport Road). He called his new enterprise the Landport Drapery Bazaar after the district that the store was located in. The store was also known to locals as the "LDB".

The original store was destroyed by fire in 1908, and subsequently rebuilt. However, in 1941 the store received a direct hit from a German Bomber which left a giant crater in the middle of the store.

The business however returned as part of the Portsmouth rebuilding programme, with a new store within the re-constructed Town centre during the 1950s. But in 1965 the store was purchased by the United Drapery Stores and subsequently in 1982 the store was converted to an Allders.

The Allders store was sold in 2005 to Debenhams.

References

Allders
Buildings and structures in Portsmouth
Debenhams
Defunct department stores of the United Kingdom
Defunct retail companies of the United Kingdom
Companies based in Portsmouth
Retail companies established in 1870
Retail companies disestablished in 1982
Department store buildings in the United Kingdom